Flight 222 may refer to:

Flight 222 (film), 1986 Soviet film
TANS Perú Flight 222, crashed on 9 January 2003 
TransAsia Airways Flight 222, crashed on 23 July 2014

0222